This is a list of television serial dramas released by TVB in 2021, including highest-rated television dramas and award ceremonies.

Top ten drama series in ratings
The following is a list of TVB's top serial dramas in 2021 by viewership ratings. The recorded ratings include premiere week, final week, finale episode, and the average overall count of live Hong Kong viewers (in millions).

Awards

First line-up
These dramas air in Hong Kong every Monday to Sunday from 8:00 pm to 8:30 pm on Jade.

Remark: Starting on 24 July 2021 until 7 Aug 2021 from 7:30 pm to 8:00 pm due to 2020 Tokyo Olympic Games.

Second line-up
These dramas air in Hong Kong from 8:30 pm to 9:30 pm, Monday to Friday on Jade.
 
Remark: Starting on 4 Jan 2021 from 8:30 p.m to 10:30 p.m on Saturday, with two back-to-back episode until 13 Feb 2021 only on Jade. Starting on 19 July 2021 there will not be premiering on the drama series due to the premiere of 2020 Tokyo Olympic Games which on 23 July 2021 to 08 Aug 2021. Drama series will be starting returned on 09 Aug 2021.

Third line-up
These dramas air in Hong Kong from 9:30 pm to 10:30 pm, Monday to Friday on Jade.

Remark: Starting on 19 July 2021 to 22 July 2021 from 10:00 pm to 11:00 pm then starting on 23 July 2021 to 06 Aug 2021 from 10:15 pm to 11:15 pm extra hours of the episode due to 2020 Tokyo Olympic Games.

References

External links
TVB.com Official Website 

2021
2021 in Hong Kong television